Alone (French: Sola) is a 1931 French drama film directed by Henri Diamant-Berger and starring Marie-Louise Damien, Henri Rollan and Ginette Maddie. A cabaret singer is stranded in Singapore, struggling to raise the funds for her passage back to France. The film is still extant, unlike a number of productions of the era.

Cast
 Marie-Louise Damien as Sola 
 Henri Rollan as Jeff 
 Ginette Maddie as Marianne 
 Jean-Louis Allibert as Yvon 
 Marguerite Moreno as Ellane 
 Nadine Picard as Nadia 
 Marcel Vallée as Célestin 
 Pierre Moreno as Auguste 
 Habib Benglia as L'Hindou 
 Henri Lévêque as Albert 
 Louis Merlac as Le docteur 
 Pierre Larquey as Le comandant 
 Jean Robert as Alex

References

Bibliography 
 Arthur Knight & Pamela Robertson Wojcik. Soundtrack Available: Essays on Film and Popular Music. Duke University Press, 3 December 2001.

External links 
 

1931 films
French drama films
1931 drama films
1930s French-language films
Films directed by Henri Diamant-Berger
Films set in Singapore
French black-and-white films
1930s French films